Ted Young may refer to:
Ted Young (journalist) (born 1961), British journalist and the current editor of Metro
Ted Young (politician), Fijian politician
Ted Young (basketball) (born 1960), American basketball player

See also 
 Edward Young (disambiguation)